Nakara may refer to:

Nakara (drum), an Indian musical instrument
Nakara (martial art), a traditional martial art in the culture of Kiribati
Nakara, Northern Territory, a suburb of Darwin, Australia
Nakara people, a group of Indigenous Australians
Nakkara language